Sean Ricky Sparham (born 4 December 1968 in Bexley, Greater London) is an English former professional footballer who played in the Football League as a defender for Millwall and Brentford.

Personal life 
Since leaving football, Sparham has worked as a freelance photographer and picture editor and as of February 2020 he was working as a painter and decorator in Sidcup.

Honours 
Millwall

 Football League Second Division: 1987–88

Career statistics

References

1968 births
Living people
Footballers from Bexley
English footballers
Association football defenders
Millwall F.C. players
Brentford F.C. players
English Football League players
Erith & Belvedere F.C. players
Southern Football League players